Ødevatnet or Ødevatn is a lake located in Sør-Varanger Municipality in Troms og Finnmark county, Norway. The  lake lies entirely within Øvre Pasvik National Park, to the southeast of the large lake Ellenvatnet. Unlike some other lakes in the area, it lies in a deep fault, giving it a long and narrow profile. The fault continues northeastwards, creating the Revsaksskaret cliff.

See also
List of lakes in Norway

References

Sør-Varanger
Lakes of Troms og Finnmark